Charles Elliot "Chuckie" Miller (born May 9, 1965) is a former American football defensive back who played in the National Football League (NFL) for the Indianapolis Colts during the 1988 - 1990 NFL season after being drafted in the 1987 NFL Draft by them in the eighth round with the 200th overall selection.  Leonard Russell, 1991 NFL Offensive Rookie Of The Year, is his cousin. Donovan Warren is his nephew.  Miller played high school football at Polytechnic High School in Long Beach, California and college football for the UCLA Bruins football team.

Notes

External links
Miller at Pro-football-reference.com
Miller at databasefootball.com

1965 births
Living people
People from Anniston, Alabama
Players of American football from Long Beach, California
American football defensive backs
UCLA Bruins football players
Indianapolis Colts players
Long Beach Polytechnic High School alumni